The 1980 Florida State Seminoles football team represented Florida State University in the 1980 NCAA Division I-A football season. The team was coached by Bobby Bowden and played their home games at Doak Campbell Stadium. The team was selected co-national champion by Rothman (FACT).

Schedule

Roster

Season summary
Florida State finished #5 in the AP poll and #5 in the UPI poll with a 10–2 record. The Seminoles' offense scored 369 points while the defense allowed 103 points. They were invited to the Orange Bowl for the second straight season where they played Oklahoma again.
Sam Platt led the team in rushing with 983 yards and 6 touchdowns. Rick Stockstill led the team in passing with 1377 yards and 15 touchdown passes. Michael Whiting led the team with 25 receptions while Hardis Johnson led with 419 receiving yards and 9 touchdowns. Keith Jones led the team with 5 pass interceptions.
Monk Bonasorte {DB}, Bobby Butler {DB}, Bill Capece {K}, Greg Futch {G}, Reggie Herring {LB}, Ken Lanier {OT}, Mark Macek {DT}, Paul Piurowski {LB} and Rohn Stark {P} were selected to the First team All-South Independent team. Bobby Butler, Bill Capece, Ron Simmons {NG} and Rohn Stark were selected as First team All-Americans. Bonasorte, Herring and Lanier were selected as 2nd team All-Americans and Futch, Macek and Piurowski were named Honorable Mention All-Americans by the Associated Press. Butler {Atlanta}, Lanier {Denver}, Simmons {Cleveland}, Piurowski {Dallas} and Capece {Houston Oilers} were selected in the 1981 NFL draft. Butler was a #1 pick.

at LSU
Bill Capece kicked three field goals and Florida State’s defense held Louisiana State without any points as the Seminoles opened their season with a 16-0 victory in Tiger Stadium. Florida State led 6-0 at halftime on field goals of 34 and 35 yards by Capece. The only touchdown of the game came with 2:32 remaining in the third quarter. Sam Platt ran in from four yards out for the score.

Louisville
Rick Stockstill threw four touchdown passes as the Seminoles routed Louisville 52-0 before the biggest crowd ever (52,623) to see a football game at Doak Campbell Stadium. The Seminoles got the first six of their seven touchdowns on passes, as Kelly Lowrey and Blair Williams followed Stockstill with one apiece. Stockstill threw TD passes to Dennis McKinnon (8 yards), Zeke Mowatt (7 yards), Hardis Johnson (26 yards) and Phil Williams (19 yards). Johnson and McKinnon caught TD passes from Lowrey and Williams and Ron Hester returned an interception 50 yards for a touchdown.

East Carolina
With a devastating running game and formidable defense, the Seminoles romped to a 63-7 victory. Sam Platt ran for 130 yards on 29 carries and Mike Whiting 71 yards on 15 carries. Rick Stockstill completed 10 of 11 passes for 132 yards. Ahead 35-7 going into the final quarter, the Seminoles added four more touchdowns and 28 points in the 4th quarter. Michael Whiting, Ken Burnett and Larry Harris each ran for two touchdowns. FSU rolled up 559 yards of total offense while holding the Pirates to 102 yards of total offense.

at Miami
Fumble after fumble after fumble on the quarterback-center exchange stymied the frustrated Seminoles throughout the game as Florida State came tumbling down 10-9 in Miami. Trailing 10-3 late in the 4th quarter, the Seminoles almost pulled it out in the final minutes, driving 55 yards to a touchdown that came on an 11 yard pass from Rick Stockstill to Sam Childers with 39 seconds left. Coach Bobby Bowden made the decision to go for a winning two points, rather than settle for a 10-10 tie. Stockstill’s pass in the quest for two hit the helmet of leaping nose guard at the line of scrimmage and never had a chance to reach a Seminole.

at Nebraska
Trailing by 4 points as the clock wound down under 15 seconds, Nebraska QB Jeff Quinn was hit only three yards from the end zone, forcing a fumble which was recovered by Florida State. The Seminoles escaped Lincoln with a win. Behind 14-0 by the middle of the second quarter, Florida State fought back. The Seminoles took the lead for good, at 15-14, on the third field goal by Bill Capece, with 1:16 left in the third quarter. Capece added a 41 yard field goal with 2:31 left in the game.

Pittsburgh
Bill Capece kicked five field goals and Florida State fought from behind to a 36-22 victory over previously unbeaten 4th ranked Pittsburgh. Rick Stockstill threw three touchdown passes. Stockstill’s TD passes went to Hardis Johnson (23 yards), Sam Childers (4 yards) and Kurt Unglaub (13 yards). Keith Jones, Monk Bonasorte and Bobby Butler intercepted Dan Marino passes to lead the defense.

Boston College
Bill Capece kicked four field goals, and linebacker Ron Hester twice blocked Boston College punts as Florida State beat Boston College, 41-7, before a homecoming crowd of 52,396 at Doak Campbell Stadium. Hester returned one of his blocked punts 33 yards for a touchdown. Michael Whiting, Rick Stockstill and Kelly Lowery all ran for touchdowns.

at Memphis
Sam Platt rushed for 188 yards in 29 carries, breaking the school single-game record, leading the Seminoles to a 24-3 victory. The Seminoles had 464 yards of total offense while holding the Tigers to 183 yards of total offense. Platt and Michael Whiting ran for touchdowns and Rick Stockstill threw an 18 yard TD pass to Hardis Johnson.

Tulsa
Florida State routed the Golden Hurricane in a 45-2 victory before 47,683 fans at Doak Campbell Stadium. Florida State outgained Tulsa 444 yards to 160 yards. Michael Whiting ran for two touchdowns, Sam Platt and Ricky Williams each ran for one. Rick Stockstill passed for two touchdowns, one to Hardis Johnson (17 yards) and Kurt Unglaub (10 yards).

Virginia Tech
Scoring two touchdowns in 51 seconds, Florida State's football team overcame a sluggish start and went on to whip Virginia Tech 31-7 at Doak Campbell Stadium. FSU moved to 8-0 on games televised on ABC under Bobby Bowden. The Seminoles fell behind 7-0, then poured it on, scoring 31 straight points. Rick Stockstill ran for a touchdown and threw two touchdowns to Hardis Johnson. Sam Platt added a 9 yard TD run in the 4th quarter.

Florida

Florida had a 13-3 lead well into the 3rd quarter on a Wayne Peace 53 yard TD pass to Tyrone Young and two Brian Clark field goals, one from 38 yards and the other from 36 yards. The Seminoles stormed back behind quarterback Rick Stockstill, who threw two touchdown passes to Hardis Johnson to lead the Noles to a 17-13 victory.

Hardis Johnson - ABC Player of Game 
FSU: 16th straight win at home

1981 Orange Bowl
After a scoreless first quarter, Ricky Williams put Florida State ahead with his touchdown run, and Oklahoma countered with a long field goal by Mike Keeling; the Seminoles led 7–3 at halftime. To start the second half, Oklahoma drove 78 yards on twelve plays, and halfback David Overstreet scored from four yards out to take a 10–7 lead. A short field goal by Bill Capece tied the game at ten for the last tally of the third quarter. Four minutes into the final quarter, cornerback Bobby Butler recovered a botched punt snap in the end zone to give the Seminoles a 17–10 lead. With 3:19 remaining, Oklahoma's fate laid in the hands of senior quarterback J. C. Watts, who had turned the ball over three times on fumbles. He led the Sooners on a 78 yard drive, culminating with an eleven yard touchdown pass to wide receiver Steve Rhodes with 1:33 remaining. Down by a point, Oklahoma opted for the two point conversion attempt, and Watts completed a pass to tight end Forrest Valora in the end zone for a one point lead. Florida State tried to counter back, but Capece's 62 yard field goal attempt fell short, and the Sooners were victorious

References

Florida State
Florida State Seminoles football seasons
Florida State Seminoles football